Jalal al-Din Ali was the last ruler of the Ghurid branch of Bamyan, ruling from 1206 to 1215.

Biography 
He was the son of Baha al-Din Sam II, and had a brother named Ala al-Din Muhammad. Not much is known about Jalal al-Din's early life, except that he married the daughter of his relative Ala al-Din Atsiz.

After the assassination of the Ghurid supreme leader Mu'izz al-Din Muhammad in 1206, Jalal al-Din's father Baha al-Din Sam II was supported by the native Iranian soldiers, while the Turkic ghulams supported another Ghurid prince named Ghiyath al-Din Mahmud. Baha al-Din Sam II, however, died a few days later, and was succeeded by Jalal al-Din, who, along with his brother Ala al-Din Muhammad, were supported by their father's supporters. Jalal al-Din shortly crowned Ala al-Din Muhammad as the ruler of Ghazni, and then went back to his capital, Bamiyan. However, the two brothers shortly came in a dispute between Bamiyan, and meanwhile the Turkic general Taj al-Din Yildiz wrested Ghazni from Ala al-Din Muhammad.

During the following years, the Khwarazmian Empire began slowly conquering the Ghurid kingdom, and in 1215 the Khwarazm-shah Muhammad II invaded the domains of Jalal al-Din, where he defeated and killed the latter, while incorporating Bamiyan into his empire, thus putting an end to the Ghurid branch of Bamiyan.

References

Sources 

 
 

12th-century Iranian people
13th-century Iranian people
Ghurid dynasty
1215 deaths
12th-century births